Jan Filip Libicki (born 17 January 1971 in Poznań) is a Polish politician.

Early life
Jan Filip Libicki was born on 17 January 1971 in Poznań, Poland. His father, Marcin Libicki, is a member of the European Parliament.
He was born with cerebral palsy. Due to his health state, he moves with wheelchair.

Career
He was elected to Sejm on 25 September 2005, getting 17503 votes in 39 Poznań district, standing for Law and Justice. He joined Poland Comes First when that party split from Law and Justice in 2010.

In 2011, he successfully ran for Poland's Senate as a Civic Platform candidate. In 2012, he officially became a member of Civic Platform. He left Civic Platform within the protest of suspending the 3 MP's of PO after voting against abortion law liberalization which was under the party discipline in that voting. Before 2019 Polish parliamentary election he joined at Polish People's Party and having been elected as a senator. He was successfully cured of COVID-19 being hospitalized for a few weeks.

Views
Libicki supports banning abortion in case of fetal abnormalities. He opposes introduction of civil unions in Poland. He identifies as Catholic.

See also
Members of Polish Sejm 2005-2007

References

External links
Jan Filip Libicki - parliamentary page - includes declarations of interest, voting record, and transcripts of speeches.

1971 births
Living people
Politicians from Poznań
Poland Comes First politicians
Law and Justice politicians
Civic Platform politicians
Members of the Polish Sejm 2005–2007
Members of the Polish Sejm 2007–2011
Members of the Senate of Poland 2011–2015
Members of the Senate of Poland 2015–2019
Members of the Senate of Poland 2019–2023
Politicians with disabilities
People with cerebral palsy
Polish Roman Catholics